Embers and Ashes is the debut studio album by jazz vocalist and pianist Shirley Horn, released in 1961.

Track listing
 "Like Someone in Love" (Jimmy Van Heusen, Johnny Burke) - 2:27
 "He Never Mentioned Love" (Curtis Reginald Lewis) - 3:59
 "Softly, as in a Morning Sunrise" (Sigmund Romberg, Oscar Hammerstein II) - 3:21
 "I Thought About You" (Van Heusen, Johnny Mercer) - 2:58
 "Mountain Greenery" (Richard Rodgers, Lorenz Hart) - 2:11
 "God Bless the Child" (Arthur Herzog, Jr., Billie Holiday) - 3:35
 "Blue City" (Lewis) - 3:30
 "Day by Day" (Axel Stordahl, Paul Weston, Sammy Cahn) - 2:30
 "If I Should Lose You" (Leo Robin, Ralph Rainger) - 3:15
 "Wild Is the Wind" (Dmitri Tiomkin, Ned Washington) - 3:37
 "Come Rain or Come Shine" (Harold Arlen, Mercer)
 "Just in Time" (Jule Styne, Betty Comden, Adolph Green) - 2:05

Personnel
Shirley Horn – vocals
Joe Benjamin – double bass
Lewis Packer
Herbie Lovelle – drums
Harry T. "Stump" Saunders

References
Shirley Horn discography

1960 debut albums
Shirley Horn albums